Sheerer is a surname. Notable people with the surname include:

 Gary Sheerer (born 1947), American water polo player
 Judy Sheerer (born 1940), American politician
 Mary Given Sheerer (1865–1954), American ceramicist, designer, and art educator

See also
 Shearer, another surname
 Sharer, another surname